Clinton Shorter (born March 18, 1971) is a Canadian film and television composer. He is particularly known for his score for Neill Blomkamp's film District 9. He has also composed the music for over 300 television episodes.

Early life and education
Shorter was born in North Vancouver, British Columbia. He initially studied jazz in college before switching to music composition.

Career
Shorter created the score for an independent film, Come Together, in Vancouver.  He went on to create music for several more films in the Vancouver area, including Neill Blomkamp 's short Alive in Joburg.

Shorter was asked to create a score for Blomkamp's 2009 science fiction film District 9, "something 'raw and dark' but which maintained its African roots". The resulting music has been described by reviewers as "rhythmic" and "magnificent",  as "mournful ethnic-action strains", and as having "pseudo-exotic ambiance as a post-modern theme of loss".  The sound track was released separately as a CD.

In 2014 Shorter wrote the score for the action film Pompeii. He subsequently composed music for the television series The Expanse and Colony.

Discography

Film

Television

References

External links
 Official Clinton Shorter website
 Clinton Shorter at Apple Music
 
 

1971 births
Living people
Canadian film score composers
Canadian television composers
Male film score composers
Male television composers
Musicians from British Columbia
People from North Vancouver